Patriarch Parthenius III may refer to:

 Parthenius III of Constantinople, Ecumenical Patriarch of Constantinople in 1656–1657
 Patriarch Parthenius III of Alexandria, Greek Orthodox Patriarch of Alexandria in 1987–1996